The Joint is Jumpin may refer to:

Music
 "The Joint is Jumpin, a 1937 song by Fats Waller, co-credited with Andy Razaf and J. C. Johnson
 The Joint is Jumpin, a 1981 album by Eight to the Bar
 The Joint is Jumpin, a 1998 album by Jake Hanna
 The Joint is Jumpin, a 1997 album by Ray Kamalay and his Red Hot Peppers
 The Joint is Jumpin, a 1987 album by Stan Mark and his River City StomperZ
 The Joint is Jumpin': the Music of Fats Waller, a 2003 album by Ralph Sutton
 "The Joint is Jumpin, a song on the 2016 album The Boop-A-Doo by Cherry Poppin' Daddies
 "The Joint is Jumpin, a song on the 1987 album Ain't Misbehavin' by Clark Terry
 "The Joint is Jumpin, a song on the 2012 album Dee Does Broadway by Dee Snider
 "The Joint is Jumpin, a song on the 1985 album They Said It Couldn't Be Done by Grandmaster Flash
 "The Joint is Jumpin, a song on the 1979 album Ain't Misbehavin' by Hank Jones
 "The Joint is Jumpin, a song on the 2006 album All Rise: A Joyful Elegy for Fats Waller by Jason Moran 
 "The Joint is Jumpin, a song on the 2001 album Downtown Blues by Steve Allee

Other uses
The Joint is Jumpin (film), 1949